

Arrow Aircraft (Leeds) Limited was a British aircraft manufacturer of the 1930s based in Leeds. Its most significant design was the Arrow Active, an example of which is still flying as of 2007.

References
 

Defunct aircraft manufacturers of the United Kingdom
Companies based in Leeds